A sacrilege is the mistreatment of a sacred object.

Sacrilege may also refer to:

Music
Sacrilege (band), a punk band from England
Sacrilege (album), an album by Can
"Sacrilege" (song), a single by the Yeah Yeah Yeahs from Mosquito
"Sacrilege", a song by AFI from Crash Love

Other uses
 Devils of Monza or Sacrilege, a 1987 erotic drama film
 Sacrilege (2020 film), a British horror film